"Rette mich" is a song by German rock band Tokio Hotel, released as the third single from their debut album, Schrei (2005). The single version of "Rette mich", re-recorded as lead singer Bill Kaulitz's voice began to deepen, formed part of the Schrei - so laut du kannst release. The band later recorded an English-language version of the song, entitled "Rescue Me", for their third studio album Scream.

Music video
The video involves the band playing in what looks like a boarded-up, abandoned room. The walls of the room start closing in on the second verse. The main storyline of the video however, is about lead singer Bill Kaulitz singing in a similar room, alone. As he gets up, he finds it hard to keep his balance - he keeps sliding around everywhere. He tries to grab hold of objects numerous times, but in the end gives up and slides; at this moment the rest of the band appears in the room.

Track listings
 German CD single
 "Rette mich" (video version) – 3:50
 "Rette mich" (acoustic version) – 3:42

 German maxi-CD single
 "Rette mich" (video version) – 3:49
 "Rette mich" (acoustic version) – 3:42
 "Thema Nr. 1" (demo 2003) – 3:14
 "Rette mich" (video) – 3:48
 "Durch den Monsun" (live video) – 5:42

Charts

Weekly charts

Year-end charts

References

Tokio Hotel songs
2005 songs
2006 singles
German-language songs
Island Records singles
Number-one singles in Austria
Number-one singles in Germany
Songs written by David Jost